Herbert Macon Yount [Ducky/Hub] was a professional baseball pitcher. He played one season in Major League Baseball for the Baltimore Terrapins of the Federal League in 1914. He threw right-handed and batted right-handed. He was 6'2 and 178 lbs (pounds) and in 1914 he was 28. He was born on December 7, 1885 in Iredell County, North Carolina and died on May 9, 1970 in Winston-Salem, North Carolina.

Sources

Major League Baseball pitchers
Baltimore Terrapins players
Meridian Ribboners players
Vicksburg Hill Billies players
Freeport Pretzels players
Lowell Tigers players
Lowell Grays players
Worcester Busters players
New Bedford Whalers (baseball) players
Springfield Tips players
Baseball players from North Carolina
People from Iredell County, North Carolina
1885 births
1970 deaths
Chester Collegians players